Lewis Scott may refer to:

People 
Lewis Allaire Scott (1759–1798), American politician
Lewis Everett Scott (1892–1960), American baseball shortstop
Lewis Scott (racing driver) in 2011 24 Hours of Nürburgring
Lewis Scot, pirate

Fiction 
Lewis Scott, a character in Waterland
Lewis Scott, a character in "Celtic Pride"

See also
Louis Scott (disambiguation)
Scott Lewis (disambiguation)

Scott (name)